Microlensing Observations in Astrophysics (MOA) is a collaborative project between researchers in New Zealand and Japan, led by Professor Yasushi Muraki of Nagoya University. They use microlensing to observe dark matter, extra-solar planets, and stellar atmospheres from the Southern Hemisphere. The group concentrates especially on the detection and observation of gravitational microlensing events of high magnification, of order 100 or more, as these provide the greatest sensitivity to extrasolar planets. They work with other groups in Australia, the United States and elsewhere. Observations are conducted at New Zealand's Mt. John University Observatory using a  reflector telescope built for the project.

In September 2020, astronomers using microlensing techniques reported the detection, for the first time, of an earth-mass rogue planet unbounded by any star, and free floating in the Milky Way galaxy. In January 2022 in collaboration with Optical Gravitational Lensing Experiment (OGLE) they reported in a preprint the first rogue BH while there have been others candidates this is the most solid detection so far as their technique allowed to measure not only the amplification of light but also its deflection by the BH from the microlensing data.

MOA telescope mirror images

Planets discovered
The following planets have been announced by this survey, some in conjunction with other surveys.

See also
 Optical Gravitational Lensing Experiment or OGLE, a similar microlensing survey
 List of extrasolar planets

References

External links
MOA website
MicroFUN - Microlensing Follow-Up Network

Astronomical surveys
Experiments for dark matter search
Gravitational lensing
Exoplanet search projects